This list presents the establishment of psychological laboratories from 1879 to 1948.

The list is primarily based on the list from "Historical and Conceptual Issues in Psychology" (Brysbaert, M. & Rastle, K. (2013)). This current list considered only the establishment of laboratories. Any psychology courses, seminars or lectures were excluded. However, due to inconsistent listings from some of the sources and  different definitions of what comprises a laboratory, there is a possibility that a course instead of the establishment of a laboratory is listed. In the case of difference in the year from the sources, the earliest date was taken.

References 

 Shiraev, E. (2014). A history of psychology: A global perspective. Sage Publications.

History of psychology
Laboratories, list of